Poledno  is a village in the administrative district of Gmina Bukowiec, within Świecie County, Kuyavian-Pomeranian Voivodeship, in north-central Poland.

Level crossing crash 
On November 15, 2007 there was a collision of a train and truck with paper,2 people killed.

References

Poledno